The 1979 Oklahoma State Cowboys football team represented Oklahoma State University in the Big Eight Conference during the 1979 NCAA Division I-A football season. In their first season under head coach Jimmy Johnson, the Cowboys compiled a 7–5 record (5–2 against conference opponents), finished in third place in the conference, and were outscored by opponents by a combined total of 212 to 191.

The team's statistical leaders included Worley Taylor with 994 rushing yards, Harold Bailey with 1,301 passing yards, Ron Ingram with 323 receiving yards, and placekicker Colin Ankersen with 55 points scored.

The team played its home games at Lewis Field in Stillwater, Oklahoma.

Schedule

Roster
QB John Doerner
FB Terry Suellentrop (offense)

1980 NFL Draft

The following Cowboys were selected in the 1980 NFL draft.

References

Oklahoma State
Oklahoma State Cowboys football seasons
Oklahoma State Cowboys football